Mexico–Saudi Arabia relations are the diplomatic relations between Mexico and Saudi Arabia. Both nations are mutual members of the G-20 major economies and the United Nations.

History 
Mexico and Saudi Arabia established diplomatic relations on 12 September 1952. On 31 July 1975, Mexican President Luis Echeverría paid a five-day visit to Saudi Arabia and met with King Khalid bin Abdulaziz Al Saud in Jeddah. The two leaders also discussed current events taking place in the Middle East at the time.

In October 1981, Saudi Crown Prince Fahd bin Abdulaziz Al Saud visited Mexico to attend the North–South Summit and met with Mexican President José López Portillo. In 1981, both nations opened embassies in each other's capital's, respectively. In June 2010, Mexican Foreign Minister Patricia Espinosa Cantellano paid a visit to Saudi Arabia. In March 2014, Mexican Foreign Minister José Antonio Meade paid a visit to Saudi Arabia.

In January 2016, Mexican President Enrique Peña Nieto, paid an official visit to Saudi Arabia. During his visit, President Peña Nieto met with King Salman bin Abdulaziz Al Saud and together they signed 11 bilateral agreements in: cooperation on combating organized crime; tax evasion cooperation and the abolishment of double taxation; energy; trade; protection of investments and cultural and sports agreements. President Peña Nieto also awarded the Order of the Aztec Eagle to King Salman. In December 2018, Saudi Minister of State Mansour bin Mutaib Al Saud attended the inauguration for Mexican President Andrés Manuel López Obrador.

In March 2022, Mexican Foreign Minister Marcelo Ebrard paid a visit to Saudi Arabia and met with his counterpart Saudi Foreign Minister Faisal bin Farhan Al Saud. During the visit, both nations agreed to strengthen bilateral economic relations and spoke of a need for a direct air route between the two nations. Both nations celebrated 70 years of diplomatic relations.

High-level visits

High-level visits from Mexico to Saudi Arabia
 President Luis Echeverría (1975)
 Foreign Minister Patricia Espinosa Cantellano (2010)
 Foreign Undersecretary Lourdes Aranda (2011)
 Foreign Minister José Antonio Meade (2014)
 Foreign Undersecretary Carlos de Icaza (2014, 2015)
 President Enrique Peña Nieto (2016)
 Foreign Minister Marcelo Ebrard (2022)

High-level visits from Saudi Arabia to Mexico
 Crown Prince Fahd bin Abdulaziz Al Saud (1981)
 Minister of State Mansour bin Mutaib Al Saud (2018)

Bilateral agreements
Both nations have signed several bilateral agreements such as a Memorandum of Understanding of Cooperation between both nations Diplomatic Institutions (2009); Memorandum of Understanding for the Establishment of Political Consultations on Issues of Mutual Interest (2014); Agreement on the Avoidance of Double-Taxation (2016); Agreement of Cooperation between both nations Banks for Development and Exportations (2016); Agreement on Air Services (2016); Agreement on Tourism Cooperation (2016); Memorandum of Understanding in Cooperation the Oil and Gas Sectors (2016); Memorandum of Understanding between Pemex and Saudi Aramco (2016) and an Agreement of Cooperation to Combat Organized Crime (2017).

Trade relations 
In 2018, two-way trade between both nations amounted to US$352 million. Saudi Arabia is Mexico's biggest trading partner among the Arab nations and 41st globally. Mexico's main exports to the kingdom include: copper wires, aluminium alloy and honey. Saudi Arabia's main exports to Mexico include: gas and propane gas. Mexican multinational company KidZania operates in Saudi Arabia.

Resident diplomatic missions 
 Mexico has an embassy in Riyadh.
 Saudi Arabia has an embassy in Mexico City.

See also 
 Arab Mexican
 Islam in Mexico

References 

 
Saudi Arabia
Bilateral relations of Saudi Arabia